Master Madan (Gurmukhi: ਮਾਸਟਰ ਮਦਨ; 28 December 1927 – 5 June 1942) was a talented Ghazal and geet singer of India of pre-independence era.  During his life, he only recorded eight songs, and these are now commonly available.  He was born 28 December 1927, in Khan Khana, a village in District Jalandhar District (now Nawanshahar) of the Punjab. This village was found by reputed courtier of Akbar, Abdul Rahim Khan-i-khana, who was a prolific writer. He died on 5 June 1942, reportedly due to mercury poisoning of his milk while at Shimla.

His eight songs are:
 Bagaan wich peengan paiyaan (Punjabi) 
 Raavi de parle kandey (Punjabi)
 Yun naa reh reh kar hamein tarsaaiye (Urdu Ghazal)
 Heyrat se tak rahaay hain jahane wafaa mujhe (Urdu Ghazal)
 Goree goree baiyaan  (Thumri)
 Mori bintee mano kanha re (Thumri) 
 Man ki man hi mahi rahi (Gurbani)
 Chetnaa hei to chet le (Gurbani)

References

External links

A child prodigy: Master Madan (An article by The Academy of the Punjab in North America)
All of his eight songs
Some Information about Master Madan
Some Information about Master Madan

Indian male ghazal singers
People from Jalandhar district
1927 births
1942 deaths
20th-century Indian male singers
20th-century Indian singers
Deaths by poisoning